Voice is the sixth studio album (ninth overall) by Japanese singer Mika Nakashima, released via Sony Music Japan on November 26, 2008. It contains all of her singles from "Life" up to "Orion". The album was distributed in two formats: a CD-only version and CD+DVD limited edition.

Following its release, Voice became Nakashima's first number one album on the Oricon Albums Chart since Best (2005). It has been certified platinum by the RIAJ for physical shipments of over 250,000 copies in Japan, and has since amassed sales of over 340,000 copies.

Singles
"Life" was released as the album's first single on August 22, 2007. The song is an adult contemporary pop/rock number and was used as the theme song for the drama of the same name, starring Kii Kitano and Saki Fukuda. The B-side "It's Too Late" was used for an Kanebo Cosmetics CM, which starred Nakashima herself.

"Eien no Uta" is a reggae-inflected ballad with Stephen McGregor serving as the producer. It was used as the theme song of the movie Southbound (2007). The B-side is a cover of Cole Porter's "You'd Be So Nice To Come Home To," and was made with jazz band Katteni-Shiyagare and previously included on her Katteni-Shiyagare tribute album, Let's Get Lost.

"Sakura Hanagasumi" is an adult contemporary ballad with a more poignant mood than "Sakurairo Mau Koro" (2005). The Daishi dance version of the song appears on the Voice album instead of the original version, which is featured in its promotional video. The next release, "I Don't Know", was Mika's first English-language single. It is a collaboration with owarai group Morisanchuu and was her first single to be released in a CD+DVD format in addition to the regular CD-only format. It includes the B-side track "Shut Up".

"Orion" is an lite rock-influenced ballad and was released on November 12, 2008. It was the insert song for the Japanese TBS drama, Ryūsei no Kizuna, in which co-starred Mika. The B-side song "Focus" was used for the television commercial of the Canon IXY Digital 920 IS camera.

Track listing

Charts and sales

Daily and weekly charts

Year-end charts

Sales and certifications

References

2008 albums
Mika Nakashima albums